The Colombia national football team has been under the supervision of 39 different managers since its first match in 1938.

Managers

Last updated: Colombia vs. Paraguay, 16 November 2021. Statistics include official FIFA-recognised matches only.

References

Colombia